John Smyth was an Anglican Archdeacon in Ireland in the late seventeenth and early eighteenth centuries.

He was born in County Armagh; and educated at Trinity College, Dublin. He was Vicar of Donaghmoyne from 1663  and Archdeacon of Clogher  from 1682, holding both positions until his death in 1704.

References

17th-century Irish Anglican priests
18th-century Irish Anglican priests
People from County Armagh
Archdeacons of Clogher
Alumni of Trinity College Dublin
1704 deaths